Xinshao County is a county in the Province of Hunan, China, it is under the administration of Shaoyang City. Located in central Hunan, the county is bordered to the north by Lianyuan City, Lengshuijiang City and Xinhua County, to the west by Longhui County, to the south by Shaoyang County and the city proper of Shaoyang. The county has 13 towns and two townships under its jurisdiction, the county seat is Niangxi.

Administrative divisions
13 towns
 Chenjiafang
 Cunshi
 Daxin
 Jukoupu
 Longxipu
 Niangxi
 Pingshang
 Quetang
 Taizhimiao
 Tanxi
 Xiaotang
 Xintianpu
 Yantang

2 townships
 Tanfu
 Yingguang

Climate

References

External links

 
County-level divisions of Hunan
Shaoyang